The 1899 Miami Redskins football team was an American football team that represented Miami University during the 1899 college football season. Under new head coach George Greenleaf, Miami compiled a 1–5 record.

Schedule

Notes

References

Miami
Miami RedHawks football seasons
Miami Redskins football